Kim Poong-Joo is a South Korean football coach and former player who played for the Pusan Daewoo Royals.

Club career statistics

Coach & Manager Career 
 1997-1999 : Pusan Daewoo Royals Goalkeeper Coach
 2000 : Jaehyun Elementary School Goalkeeper Coach
 2002-2003 : South Korea U-20 Goalkeeper Coach
 2004–2008 : Ulsan Hyundai Horang-i Goalkeeper Coach
 2009-2011 : South Korea U-20 / South Korea U-17 Goalkeeper Coach
 2012–2013 : South Korea Goalkeeper Coach
 2013–     : Goyang Daekyo Noonnoppi Goalkeeper Coach

International clean sheets
Results list South Korea's goal tally first.

External links
 
 
 
 

1964 births
Living people
Association football goalkeepers
South Korean footballers
South Korea international footballers
Busan IPark players
K League 1 players
1990 FIFA World Cup players
Footballers at the 1988 Summer Olympics
Olympic footballers of South Korea
Asian Games medalists in football
Footballers at the 1990 Asian Games
Asian Games bronze medalists for South Korea
Medalists at the 1990 Asian Games